Pelicans SC is a Sri Lankan professional football club based in Kurunegala. They play in the highest domestic football league, the Sri Lanka Champions League.

References

 Pelican SC at WorldFootball.com

Football clubs in Sri Lanka